is a manga series created by Tetsuhiro Koshita, first serialized in Shogakukan's CoroCoro Comic magazine from July 1994 to October 1999. The manga centers on Retsu and Go Seiba, twin brothers who focus on the world of miniature car racing known as Mini 4WD. It is created as a tie-in to Tamiya's Mini 4WD franchise (Mainly Fully Cowled, Mechanical and Aero), and it is the second series to center on the franchise since Dash! Yonkuro.

Three anime adaptations of the manga were produced by Xebec from 1996 to 1998, each of which consisting of three 51-episode series, and was also made into several games. The series also released various merchandise, including CDs, trading cards, stickers, and even die-cast cars. In 2014, a sequel series, Return Racers, began serialization in Shogakukan's CoroCoro Aniki magazine, 20 years after the original series' serialization. A spinoff manga, which focuses on Tsubasa, was serialized on CoroCoro Ichiban in August 2017.

Plot
Mini 4WD racing is an interesting hobby where kids and adults compete using customized motorized miniature cars. Every year, competitions revolving around the hobby circulated around the world, where kids and adults test out their spirit and passion for racing, with companies developing new technologies and innovations for Mini 4WD cars. The story revolves around the competitive Seiba Brothers: Go and Retsu, who were once constantly arguing with each other to see who between them is the best racer. However, one day after a community-sponsored race they both met Dr. Tsuchiya, the head of the Tsuchiya Racing Factory who gave them two Mini 4WD Cars from the prototype Saber Series: Sonic Saber and Magnum Saber. With his advice to customize them for the upcoming race, they are now determined to win, race to victory and set off on the wildest race of their lives while meeting both friends and enemies in the Mini 4WD Racing world.

Characters

TRF Victorys

The other title character, Retsu is an eleven-year old fifth-grade student, and Go's older brother. Although he is able to control his patience better than his brother, he still lets out his annoyance with someone once in a while, especially those who anger him. Retsu sports a green hat as his trademark. His primary color is red, which is the color of his hair, eyes, gloves and shirt. All of his Mini 4WD cars, the Sonic series, are well-rounded and have great off-road capabilities. In WGP, Retsu is the captain of the TRF Victorys. In Return Racers, he is now working in the Space Development project on recommendation of Dr. Tsuchiya.

Go is the one of the two title characters. Retsu's younger brother by one year, he is in the fourth grade. Go is initially depicted as rash, impulsive, careless, and impatient, but on some occasions, he can be calm, kind and gentle. He is usually seen wearing goggles, but they are more of a fashion accessory as they are on his forehead most of the time as opposed to covering his eyes. His primary color is blue, which is the color of his hair, eyes, gloves, and boots. His cars, the Magnum series, are all known for their speed. In Return Racers, Go has retired from Mini 4WD racing and is now a professional racing driver. In his private life, he drives a BMW Mini convertible. He met a boy named Tsubasa, who became his protege at his will as Tsubasa intends to follow Go's legacy as a Mini 4WD racer.

Ryo is a nomadic wanderer who, with his brother Jiromaru, lives off the land. When he first meets the Seiba brothers, he quickly becomes their rival, particularly that of Go. Eventually though, he becomes a friend of the Seiba brothers and as well as a member of the TRF Victorys. It later revealed that Jo from Astro Rangers had crush on him because Ryo saved her once. It was once shown when the Astro Rangers coach asked Dr. Tsuchiya where Ryo lives because one of them seems to have some feeling toward him.
 

Tokichi is a spoiled rich boy, whose father is a well-known entrepreneur. He is in fact the heir to the Mikuni Corporation. When he first meets the Seiba Brothers, Go takes an instant liking to him, most likely because of his wealth. His family owns an arcade, which is always the hot spot for kids and instantly attracts Go. When speaking, he pronounces "desu" (です, meaning "is" or "to be") as "degesu" (でげす). His cars emphasize on technical cornering ability. Tokichi also likes to make his entrances in the manners of stereotypical rich kids, such as jumping out of a helicopter, arriving in a limousine, and surrounded with an entourage with great fanfare.

Initially a battle racer in the Ōgami Corps, trained under Dr. Ōgami, he later finds enjoyment in regular racing with the Seiba brothers. Because of this, he decides to leave Ōgami Labs, renouncing the anything-to-win attitude instilled by Dr. Ōgami, and goes to live with Dr. Tsuchiya in his laboratory as an assistant. As a result, he also gradually changes in his personality, turning from an introvert into a high-spirited boy. Of all the other team members, J is the most skilled technician and mechanic, having prior experience with computers and machines while under Dr. Ōgami's training. These skills are shown on many occasions, namely when he repaired the damaged Tridagger X to repay Ryo for damaging it in a previous race, when he helped Go design and build the Cyclone Magnum and when he designed the Proto Saber EVO. He appears to be best friends with Go.

Jirōmaru is Ryo Takaba's younger brother. He likes Ryo a lot, and follows him around everywhere. His cars, the customized Saber 600, are constantly damaged in races. In episode 10 of the WGP season, Jirōmaru substitutes Ryo after his leg is injured.
 

The head of the Tsuchiya Racing Factory, he is the owner and pioneer in the Mini 4WD development, with half of his inspirations coming from his experience with jet planes, both as a pilot and an engineer, as shown in his lesser-seen parts of his labs. It is also where he found the inspiration to create the Super Avante; the prototype used for all the Saber series of Mini 4WD cars. But he has ongoing conflict in ideals against Dr. Ōgami as the story progresses. He is named after Hirotsugu Tsuchiya, a Tamiya employee.

Ichimonji Brothers

One of the two main characters of MAX, he is Retsuya's older brother. He is a former Battle Racer at Borzoi School until he and his brother quit due to their conflicting ideals between him and the academy itself. He aims to become a true Mini 4WD racer with his brother to clear his reputation. He is currently living in a workshop owned by their uncle, who is working for GEN Manufacturing. Despite his rustic behavior, he has a good heart and values the spirit of Mini 4WD racing. He is also shown to be good on mechanics.

The other main character of MAX, he is Gouki's younger brother. Like Gouki, he is also a Battle Racer at Borzoi School and is a good in racing. But like his brother, he also left the battle racing scene and decided to change for the better. He is currently living in a workshop owned by their uncle, who is working for GEN Manufacturing.

Ogami Corps

The head of Ogami Corps, Ogami is introduced as the rival scientist to Dr. Tsuchiya. He advocated battle racing, where racers are encouraged to install weapons to their Mini 4WDs and destroy their opposition during races. He worked with Dr. Tsuchiya in the past, but split due to disagreements in their beliefs about what Mini 4WD racing should be. He owns a large laboratory hidden in a volcano, where his cars are developed. He has a daughter named Marina. In MAX, he worked with Dr. Ichimonji as scientists at Borzoi School to create a new machine. He is also shown to not wear his headgear anymore and uses a cane to help him walk. Nearing the end of MAX, he would throw away his beliefs of battle racing after seeing his daughter Marina refused to use the weapons installed into her machine, Phoenix Stinger, in the final parts of the M1 race.

The daughter of Dr. Ogami, appearing in MAX. A skilled Battle Racer and Mini 4WD racer, she owns the Fire Stinger, a successor to the Ray Stinger developed by her father. Though she usually lives in a private condominium with high expenses every month, her private life remains a mystery even to the Ichimonji brothers. She is also a regular in the onsen house "Matsunoyu". She later joined the Borzoi School after being reunited with her father and her machine being upgraded to the Phoenix Stinger.

The first of the Ogami Corps' three battle racers to appear. His car, the Beak Spider, caused a massacre of Mini 4WDs around city parks, where they were secretly damaged, much to ire of their owners. Following the Summer Great Japan Cup, he is shown to develop rivalry with Ryo. In the WGP anime, he appears as the coach of the Savanna Zebra team, where the team members (led by Juliana) uses a modified version of his car dubbed Beak Zebra.

One of Ogami's battle racers, Gen is the owner of Brocken Gigant, a front-motor Mini 4WD that possesses the ability to perform a wheelie to stomp and destroy a rival car. He was the one who destroyed Go's Victory Magnum in the manga version.

One of Ogami's battle racers and the only female member of the trio, Rei is the owner of the Ray Stinger, a Mini 4WD with laser control and a needle to attack her opponents' cars. In the anime, she was the one who destroyed Go's Victory Magnum in a mid-air surprise attack.

NA Astro Rangers

Born in Washington, D.C, Brett is the captain of the NA Astro Rangers. His hair color is blond and wears a black T-shirt, a red jacket, visor goggles and black pants with a belt. While he seems to be cool, strict and snobbish, Brett is at heart caring and kind.

Born in Los Angeles, California, he's an outgoing and cheerful guy, as well as a member of a Los Angeles soccer club. He is shown to be very emotional, but he can control his anger.

A young pony tail haired girl born in New York. She kind and friendly to everyone, except Rosso Strada. She doesn't like to be underestimated, and is quick to anger. Joe has a feeling for Ryo, for he save her form a jet ski accident and ask Daizo and Danise to talk each other.

Born in Salt Lake City, Utah, Michael is the youngest member of the team, as seen with his physical appearance of an elementary student similar to the Seiba brothers. He may be small, but he's smart and skilled.
 

Born in San Francisco, Hammer D is the tallest and oldest member. Like Jun, he likes to play baseball, and when bad things happened, he begins to worry a lot and can't focus. Because of this, he is learning to concentrate himself.

Other racers

Jun has been a friend of the Seiba brothers since they were very young. She is an ace pitcher in baseball, and plays for a team named . At first, she is a novice at Mini 4WD racing, but improves in her skill through the influence of the Seiba brothers and others. In Return Racers, it's revealed she had migrated overseas to study and is now working in part of the Space development project alongside Retsu.

A regular racer whose determination can nearly overcome the Seiba brothers in the Winter GJC qualifying cup. He's the first named rival to the Seiba brothers and his friendly attitude allows him to be friends with the protagonists. His performances are not as shining as other racers, but his determination and luck allows him to win the Winter GJC. He doesn't appear much in races after the introduction of Kai Okita and Ōgami's battle racing rule. He is a part of the Super Great Japan Cup's 12 racers.

A big and rowdy racer. Kurosawa is the owner of "Black Saber", another prototype Mini 4WD created by Dr. Tsuchiya, and specializes in modification of the machine and upgrade parts to be used in various situations. Kurosawa starts out as a cheater who puts weapons into his car, but he never wins a race that way. He flies to America and comes back even more vicious. However, with the appearance of Kai Okita and his Beak Spider, which possesses weapons more powerful than Kurosawa's, he decides to race normally and becomes a permanent ally of the protagonists. He is shown to have allies; three of them (as named in Summer GJC entry list in episode 26) are named Timota, Rokukawa, and Masa.

Chiiko is Tokichi's younger sister, who has a crush on Retsu. She owns a Mini 4WD called the "Flower Axe", which is actually a customized variant of Tokichi's Spin Axe. In episode 18 of the WGP season, when Chiiko becomes jealous of the female WGP competitors, she imagines a scene where a group of female admirers crowds around Retsu. Oddly enough, the group includes Riichi, a male character.

J's older sister, who was originally thought to have died in a plane accident on her way to America while she and J were still kids. She was disappointed at J upon learning that he had defected from Ogami, but later understood why after the first race of the SGJC. She is last seen returning to America, saying that if J sees her there, she would show J what real racing is.

Supporting characters

Have a crush on Ms. Manami, Go's teacher. In the anime, he owns a legendary Mini 4WD called "Shining Scorpion" given to him by Dr. Tetshin before his retirement in racing. In the manga, he owns a star-and-striped machine that resembles Victory Magnum, the "Fighter Magnum VFX". In MAX, he went to America along with the members of TRF Victorys, Dr. Tsuchiya, Dr. Tesshin and Jiromaru. But due to his inability to speak English, he then came back to Japan, donning a mask and disguising himself as the "Masked Fighter" while doing commentary for Mini 4WD races. He would then reveal his identity as Mini 4 Fighter by removing his mask in the 48th episode of MAX.

Tamotsu is Jun's father and the manager of the Sagami Model Shop that the Seiba brothers frequent. Despite running a business, he refuses to supply any Battle Racing Parts as he believes that racing is not about destroying other vehicles.

He is the father of the Seiba brothers. Kaizō quickly developed an interest for Mini 4WD and likes to race together with his sons. His personal vehicle is a customized variant of the Saber 600, which he personally calls it the "Godfather Special". If not for the rule saying that adults can't participate on Mini 4WD competitions, he'd enter them.

The mother of the Seiba brothers, she has a bighearted and courageous personality. At first, she dislikes Mini 4WD racing, mostly due to her annoyance with Retsu and Go constantly fighting about them, but she eventually grows used to it.

The father of the Ichimonji brothers. He develops the Mini 4WD machines called the "Z Series" and is acquainted with Dr. Tsuchiya and Dr. Ogami. He was formerly employed with the Borzoi School, but he was later dismissed after Nero, the grandson of Professor Borzoi, came to Japan. He would then be helped by his brother that lent him a property owned by the acquaintance of their family at Kawashita-cho, and set his new research laboratory there.

She works as a commentator for Mini 4WD races from episode 25 of MAX. She admires Mini 4 Fighter and called Masked Fighter as "Fake Fighter" until she realized his true identity as Mini 4 Fighter in episode 48. She works part-time at GEN Manufacturing. She has been playing Mini 4WD when she was young. She owns the machine "Fighter Lady Magnum", which is a customized version of Fighter Magnum VFX.

Media

Manga
The manga series originally ran serially in CoroCoro Comic starting in the June 1994 issue through the October 1999 issue, compiling into 20 tankōbon volumes. A sequel, titled , began serialization on Coro Coro Aniki in October 2014 before it was temporarily stopeed publication and continued its serialization in Coro Coro Online until November 2021. The new series depicted Go's and Retsu's life 20 years following the end of the original series, as well as new flashback stories. A spinoff manga, titled  began serialization on Coro Coro Ichiban in August 2017.

Anime
An anime adaptation of the series was produced by Xebec, directed by Tetsurō Amino (Macross 7) and written by Hiroyuki Hoshiyama. It first aired on TV Tokyo from January 8, 1996, through December 30, 1996, covering the first half of the manga. The sequel  aired  from January 6, 1997, through December 22, 1997, covering the second half of the manga. The third series, titled , aired on from January 5, 1998, through December 21, 1998, covering the events of the sequel manga.

Film
A film based on the second series titled , was released in theaters in Japan on July 5, 1997. In the Philippines, the film was released as Let's & Go!! The Movie: Tamiya on January 12, 2001.

Games
Mini 4WD Shining Scorpion Let's & Go!! (1996, Super Famicom, ASCII Corporation)
Mini 4WD GB Let's & Go! (1997, Game Boy, ASCII Corporation)
Mini 4WD Super Factory (1997, Sega Saturn, Mediaquest)
Bakusou Kyoudai Let's & Go!! WGP Hyper Heat (1997, PlayStation, Jaleco)
Mini 4WD GB Let's & Go! All-Star Battle MAX (1998, Game Boy, ASCII Corporation)
Bakusou Kyoudai Let's & Go!! Eternal Wings (1998, PlayStation, Jaleco)
Bakusou Kyoudai Let's & Go!! POWER WGP2 (1998, Super Famicom, Nintendo)

See also
Racer Mini Yonku: Japan Cup
Mini 4WD
Dash! Yonkuro
Tamiya Corporation
CoroCoro Comic

References

External links

1996 anime television series debuts
1997 anime television series debuts
1997 anime films
1998 anime television series debuts
Animated television series about auto racing
Animated television series about children
Children's manga
IG Port franchises
Japanese children's animated action television series
Japanese children's animated adventure television series
Japanese children's animated sports television series
Motorsports in anime and manga
Seinen manga
Shōnen manga
Shogakukan franchises
Shogakukan manga
Tamiya Corporation
TV Tokyo original programming
Xebec (studio)